Ussa is an area in Nigeria.

USSA may refer to:

Organizations
United States Sailing Association, commonly known as US Sailing
United States Ski and Snowboard Association
United States Snooker Association
United States Sports Academy
United States Student Association
University of Strathclyde Students' Association

Governments
University Sports South Africa, the governing body for higher education sport in the South Africa

Media and entertainment
U.S.S.A., American rock band
United Socialist States of America, a country in the alternate history setting of Back in the USSA

Other
 Unwanted same-sex attraction, a term used in the pseudoscientific practice known as conversion therapy

See also
USA (disambiguation)